Brighton State Park is a state park in Island Pond, Vermont. The park features a campground on the 102-acre Spectacle Pond, which is mostly undeveloped. There is also a day use beach and bathhouse located on 600-acre Island Pond just a half mile from the campground.

Activities includes boating, swimming, camping, fishing, hiking, picnicking, wildlife watching and winter sports.

Facilities include two sandy beaches, bathhouse, boat rentals, 5 cabins, 61 tent/RV sites and 23 lean-tos, flush toilets, hot showers, and a dump station. There is a nature center and park rangers offer interpretive programs including night hikes, campfire programs, amphibian explorations, and nature crafts and games.

The state has designated the 15-acre Spectacle Pond Natural Area, which features a natural stand of mature red pines that are uncommon in Vermont.

References

External links
Official website

State parks of Vermont
Protected areas of Essex County, Vermont
Island Pond, Vermont
Nature centers in Vermont